Lenard Francis Biernat (born November 24, 1946) is a Minnesota politician and former member of the Minnesota House of Representatives. A member of the Democratic Farmer Labor Party, he represented District 59A, which includes a portion of Hennepin in the northwestern Twin Cities metropolitan area.

Background
Biernat served in the United States Army. He served on the Minneapolis School Board. Biernat served four terms in the House of Representatives: 80th, 81st, 82nd, and 83rd.

83rd Legislative Session (2003 - 2004)

Committees
Civil Law
Education Finance
Education Policy

82nd Legislative Session (2001 - 2002)

Committees
Education Policy
Governmental Operations and Veterans Affairs Policy
K-12 Education Finance

81st Legislative Session (1999 - 2000)

Committees
Education Policy
K-12 Education Finance
Transportation Policy

80th Legislative Session (1997 - 1998)

Committees
Education
Education Subcommittee:Facilities
Education Subcommittee: K-12 Education Finance Division
Judiciary
Judiciary Subcommittee: Civil and Family Law Division
Judiciary Subcommittee: Data Practices

He is Emeritus Professor of Law at Mitchell Hamline School of Law

Personal life
Biernat's father Thaddeus Lewis Biernat served in the Minnesota Legislature a decade prior to Biernat's first term. He has one daughter with his first wife, and three step daughters with his second wife, Christine Jax. He is retired and lives in Bonita Springs Florida.

References

School board members in Minnesota
Members of the Minnesota House of Representatives
Politicians from Minneapolis
1946 births
Living people
Place of birth missing (living people)
New York University School of Law alumni
Hamline University School of Law alumni
Military personnel from Minnesota
United States Army officers
21st-century American politicians
Minnesota State University, Mankato alumni